Julio Navarrine (or Julio Plácido Navarrine, December 20, 1889 — March 11, 1966) was an Argentinian singer, actor, poet and composer.

He is known for his tango lyrics, especially his song "'Oro muerto', of 1926, written in collaboration with Juan Raggi."

References

1889 births
1966 deaths
Tango singers
20th-century Argentine male singers